Leslie H. Close-Pozzo (born 1916) was a Uruguayan Ambassador.
Till   he was first secretary at the Uruguayan Embassy in London.
From  to   he was first secretary of the uruguayan embassy in Moscow.
From   to  he was Ambassador in Prague.
From  to  he was Ambassador in East Berlin.

References

1916 births
Year of death missing
Ambassadors of Uruguay to the Czech Republic
Ambassadors of Uruguay to Germany
Uruguayan expatriates in the United Kingdom
Uruguayan expatriates in the Soviet Union